Millcreek Township with a land size of 21.5 square miles is one of the fourteen townships of Union County, Ohio, United States.  The 2010 census found 1,305 people in the township.

Geography
Located in the southeastern part of the county, it borders the following townships:
Dover Township - north
Scioto Township, Delaware County - northeast
Concord Township, Delaware County - east
Jerome Township - south
Darby Township - southwest
Paris Township - northwest

A small part of the city of Marysville, the county seat of Union County, is located in western Millcreek Township.

Name and history
Millcreek Township was organized in the early 1820s, and named after Mill Creek. It is the only Millcreek Township remaining statewide, after the abolition of the one in Hamilton County, although there are Mill Creek Townships in Coshocton and Williams counties.

Government
The township is governed by a three-member board of trustees, who are elected in November of odd-numbered years to a four-year term beginning on the following January 1. Two are elected in the year after the presidential election and one is elected in the year before it. There is also an elected township fiscal officer, who serves a four-year term beginning on April 1 of the year after the election, which is held in November of the year before the presidential election. Vacancies in the fiscal officership or on the board of trustees are filled by the remaining trustees.

References

External links
Township website
County website

Townships in Union County, Ohio
Townships in Ohio